Forfar railway station served the town of Forfar, Angus, Scotland from 1848 to 1967 on the Scottish Midland Junction Railway. It was the second station in Forfar, following the earlier Forfar Playfield railway station terminus.

History 
The station opened on 2 August 1848 by the Scottish Midland Junction Railway. There was a goods yard to the north which was extant when the first station opened. The station closed to passengers traffic on 4 September 1967.

References

External links 

Disused railway stations in Angus, Scotland
Railway stations in Great Britain opened in 1848
Railway stations in Great Britain closed in 1967
Beeching closures in Scotland
Former Caledonian Railway stations
Forfar